Namal is a town in Punjab, Pakistan.

NAMAL is the North American Museum of Ancient Life.

Namal may also refer to:

Places 
 Namal Lake, a lake in Punjab, Pakistan
 Namal railway station, the railway station in the town of Namal

People 
 M. D. Namal Karunaratne, Sri Lankan politician
 Özgü Namal (born 1978), Turkish actress
 Namal Rajapaksa (born 1986), Sri Lankan politician
 Namal Udugama (born 1967), Sri Lankan singer, composer and songwriter

See also 
 Operation Namal
 Nammal (disambiguation)